Kuzmyno is a rural locality (a village) in Pelymskoye Rural Settlement, Kochyovsky District, Perm Krai, Russia. The population was 144 as of 2010. There are 5 streets.

Geography 
Kuzmino is located 12 km north of Kochyovo (the district's administrative centre) by road. Petukhovo is the nearest rural locality.

References 

Rural localities in Kochyovsky District